The island bronze-naped pigeon (Columba malherbii), also known as the São Tomé bronze-naped pigeon, is a species of bird in the family Columbidae. It is endemic to the Gulf of Guinea islands of Annobón (Equatorial Guinea), São Tomé and Príncipe (São Tomé and Príncipe). Its natural habitat is subtropical or tropical moist lowland forest. It is part of the subgenus Turturoena. The species of birds was described by Jules and Edouard Verreaux in 1851.

Conservation
The species has been classified as Near Threatened by the IUCN due to substantial hunting pressure, which may be increasing. While the island bronze-naped pigeon is able to make use of secondary vegetation and somewhat degraded habitats, it also may be captured more easily in such areas than in dense vegetation.

References

island bronze-naped pigeon
Birds of the Gulf of Guinea
island bronze-naped pigeon
Taxonomy articles created by Polbot